Beowulf is an Old English epic poem.

Beowulf may also refer to:

Fictional characters
 Beowulf (hero), the main character of the poem
 Beowulf (DC Comics), a DC Comics character
 Beowulf (Dune), a character in the Dune book series
 Beowulf Shaeffer, a character in the works of Larry Niven in his Known Space universe
 Beowulf, a playable character in the video game Skullgirls

Media
 Beowulf (1999 film), a science fiction fantasy action film
 Beowulf & Grendel, a 2005 film
 Beowulf (2007 film), an animated picture by Robert Zemeckis
 Beowulf (soundtrack), the soundtrack album to 2007 film
 Beowulf: The Game, a video game based on the 2007 film
 Beowulf: The Legend, a 2005 board game
 Beowulf: Return to the Shieldlands, a 2016 British TV series

Weapons
 .50 Beowulf, a high-power round used mainly in modified AR-15 rifles
 Beowulf, a set of gauntlets and greaves received by the player after defeating a character of the same name in Devil May Cry 3: Dante's Awakening

Other
 Beowülf, a 1980s thrash metal band based in Venice, California
 Beowulf cluster, a high-performance computing cluster built from ubiquitous commodity hardware, such as PCs or single-board computers
 Beowulf Mining, a Sweden-focused exploratory mining company
 Operation Beowulf, two German plans to occupy the Moonsund archipelago during World War II
 , a German Siegfried-class coastal defense ship built around 1890

See also
 List of artistic depictions of Beowulf